Najjar may refer to:
 Najjar, Kermanshah, in Howli Rural District, Kermanshah Province
 Najjar, Gilan-e Gharb, in Direh Rural District, Kermanshah Province
 Najjar, Mazandaran,  Gatab-e Shomali Rural District, Mazandaran Province
 Najjar, West Azerbaijan, Keshavarz Rural District, West Azerbaijan Province
Najjar Kola, Babol, also known as Najjār
Najjar Kola, Amol, also known as Najjār
Najjar Kola, Chalus, also known as Najjār

See also